Chipman is a village in central Alberta, Canada within Lamont County and Census Division No. 10. It is located on Highway 15, approximately 11 km (7 mi) southeast of Lamont, 22 km (14 mi) northwest of Mundare, 70 km (44 mi) east of Edmonton, and 30 km (18 mi) northeast of the Yellowhead Highway entrance to Elk Island National Park.

History
Chipman was incorporated as a village on October 21, 1913. The village has the name of Clarence Campbell Chipman, a railroad official.

Surrounding area
L.I.D. 27N4 administered the Chipman-Mundare area upon its first meeting July 14, 1906 with Councillors Michael Eleniuk (chairman), J. Wilinski, P. Bahry, and H. Theis (secretary treasurer). Councillors were paid $2 per day and the secretary treasurer's salary was originally $100. On January 25, 1913, the area became the M.D. of Pines No. 516 with Councillors A. Achtemychuk (chairman), E. Halberg, M. Kozak, W. Miskew, J. Jakubec and A. Lappenbush. M. Korczynski was secretary treasurer.

In March 1944, the M.D. of Pines No. 516 was united with the municipal districts of Wostok and Leslie to form the M.D. of Lamont No. 516. It was later renumbered as M.D. of Lamont No. 82 on April 1, 1945.

On January 1, 1968, the County of Lamont No. 30 was incorporated through the unification of the Lamont School Division No. 18 and the M.D. of Lamont No. 82. It was eventually renamed to Lamont County on January 1, 2000.

Demographics

In the 2016 Census of Population conducted by Statistics Canada, the Village of Chipman recorded a population of 274 living in 124 of its 145 total private dwellings, a  change from its 2011 population of 284.

Notable people 

 Shannon Stubbs, Canadian politician, Conservative Member of Parliament (2015-) was born near Chipman

See also 
List of communities in Alberta
List of villages in Alberta

References

External links 

1913 establishments in Alberta
Villages in Alberta